The Kent Plate is an annual rugby union knock-out club competition organised by the Kent Rugby Football Union.  It was first introduced during the 2001–02 season, with the inaugural winners being Bromley.  It is the fourth most important rugby union cup competition in Kent, behind the Kent Cup, Kent Shield and Kent Vase, but ahead of the Kent Salver.

The Kent Plate is currently open to the first teams of club sides based in Kent that have been knocked out of the first round of the Kent Cup and Kent Shield.  The format is a knockout cup with a first round, semi-finals and a final, typically to be held at a pre-determined ground at the end of April on the same date and venue as the Cup, Shield, Vase and Salver finals.

Kent Plate winners

Number of wins
Beckenham (3)
Tunbridge Wells (3)
Gravesend (2)
Maidstone (2)
Sidcup (2)
Thanet Wanderers (2)
Westcombe Park (2)
Aylesford Bulls (1)
Brockleians (1)
Canterbury (1)
Charlton Park (1)
Dartfordians (1)
Deal & Betteshanger (1)
Old Colfeians (1)
Sevenoaks (1)
Tonbridge Juddians (1)

Notes

See also
 Kent RFU
 Kent Cup
 Kent Shield
 Kent Vase
 Kent Salver
 English rugby union system
 Rugby union in England

References

External links
 Kent RFU

Recurring sporting events established in 1993
1993 establishments in England
Rugby union cup competitions in England
Rugby union in Kent